The 1902–03 season is the 29th season of competitive football by Rangers.

Overview
Rangers played a total of 29 competitive matches during the 1902–03 season.  The team finished third in Scottish League Division One, eight points behind champions Hibernian.  The team managed twelve wins from the twenty-two league matches.

The Scottish Cup campaign ended in success as the team defeated Hearts 2–0 in the second final replay. The two previous final matches were a 1–1 and 0–0 draw and all were played at Celtic Park, Glasgow.

Results
All results are written with Rangers' score first.

Scottish League Division One

Scottish Cup

Appearances

See also
 1902–03 in Scottish football
 1902–03 Scottish Cup

Rangers F.C. seasons
Rangers